Mark Kuczewski is an American philosopher and bioethicist who has been a key contributor to the New Professionalism movement in medicine and medical education. In general, interest in professionalism has been widespread in medicine probably owing to the increasing regulatory and economic pressures on the practice of medicine. Many physicians have sought to identify the focal meaning of what it is to be a doctor in an effort to revitalize the profession. Kuczewski has been among a group that includes Richard and Sylvia Creuss, John Coulehan, and Matthew Wynia who see medical professionalism as including a commitment to social justice. That is, while professionalism entails such things as etiquette, communication skills, and basic medical ethics, professions are also expected to be leaders in educating the public and in advocating for the health of the public. Such leadership requires an understanding of the factors that lead some patient populations to be underserved and a commitment to bringing about social change to ameliorate these problems.
The New Professionalism movement in medicine is a revival of communitarian bioethics that focus on the kinds of people and society we wish to be rather than on particular ethical questions of right and wrong. This focus on the relationship between the professional and the community can have important implications for medical education and professional development. While not eschewing case analysis and problem solving, the emphasis on the development of the person has created a renewed interest in narrative methods and reflection. Kuczewski has been an outspoken critic of efforts in medical education to focus on quantitative measures of professionalism education. He has argued that in an effort to make professionalism education “objective,” many medical educators are equating professionalism with trivial but easily measured behaviors.
Kuczewski’s interest in professionalism and social justice has led him to pursue ethical issues in the interactions between medicine and recent immigrant populations. He has brought his work in communitarian and casuistic methods to bear on questions such as medical repatriation, insurance for undocumented immigrants, and the eligibility of DREAMers (undocumented immigrants who were brought to the United States as children) to become practicing physicians. His scholarship and advocacy was the catalyst for the Loyola University Chicago Stritch School of Medicine becoming the first medical school in the United States to explicitly welcome applications from DREAMers with Deferred Action for Childhood Arrivals (DACA) status.
Under Kuczewski’s direction, the Neiswanger Institute for Bioethics and Health Policy at Loyola University Chicago has become a leader in educational programming to promote the relationship between medical professionalism and social justice. The Neiswanger Institute has contributed elements to the Stritch curriculum that explore the relationship between the business of medicine and social justice. The Institute also has online master of arts and doctoral programs that incorporating public health and leadership training in order to help health care professionals across the United States to promote service to the underserved.
Kuczewski was elected president of the American Society for Bioethics and Humanities and served a two-year term from 2009 to 2011. The ASBH is the major professional association in the United States for individuals engaged in bioethics and medical humanities. During his term, the society aggressively began moving toward a process called Quality Attestation that will attest to the credentials and expected competence of clinical ethics consultants.

See also
 American philosophy
 List of American philosophers

References 

 Kuczewski MG, Brubaker L. (2014) Medical Education for “Dreamers”: Barriers and Opportunities for Undocumented Immigrants. Academic Medicine
 Kuczewski MG, Brubaker L. Accepting Undocumented Immigrants: How We became the "Medical School of Dreams" and Dreamers. http://academicmedicineblog.org/accepting-undocumented-immigrants-how-we-became-the-medical-school-of-dreams-and-dreamers/
 Kuczewski MG, McCarthy M,  Michelfelder A., et al. (2014) “I Will Never Let That Be OK Again” Medical Student Reflections on Caring for Dying Patients, Academic Medicine 89(1): 1-6.
 Kuczewski MG, Brubaker L. (2013) Medical Education as Mission: Why One Medical School Chose to Accept Dreamers, Hastings Center Report  2013;43(6): 21-24.
 Kuczewski MG. Loyola University Chicago: Living Up to our Ideal of a Faith that Does Justice (also published as “The Faith of DREAMers”), Ignatian Solidarity Network, February 24. 2014 http://ignatiansolidarity.net/blog/2014/02/24/loyola-university-chicago/
 Kuczewski MG, Cassidy T. (2013) Health Care for Our Immigrant Neighbors: The Need for Justice and Hospitality. Health Care Ethics USA 21(3): 8- 16. https://www.chausa.org/docs/default-source/hceusa/health-care-for-our-immigrant-neighbors.pdf
 Fins JJ, Kodish E, Braddock C, Cohn F, Dubler NN, Derse A, Pearlman RA, Smith M, Tarzian A, Youngner S, Kuczewski MG. Quality Attestation for Clinical Ethics Consultants: A Two-Step Model from the American Society for Bioethics and Humanities. Hastings Center Report 2013;43(5): 26-36. http://www.stritch.luc.edu/
 Kuczewski MG. Responding to the Dream – Loyola Stritch School of Medicine & Dreamer Applicants, August 28, 2013. http://blogs.luc.edu/bioethics/2013/08/28/responding-to-the-dream-loyola-stritch-school-of-medicine-dreamer-applicants/
 Kuczewski MG. Can Medical Repatriation Be Ethical? Establishing Best Practices. American Journal of Bioethics 2012;12(9): 1-5; Response to Open Peer Commentaries on Can Medical repatriation Be Ethical?” pp. 37–41.
 Kuczewski MG. Who is My Neighbor? A Communitarian Analysis of Access to Health Care for                                                                     Immigrants. Theoretical Medicine and Bioethics 2011;32(4): 327-336
 Kuczewski, M.G., Villaume, F., Chang, H. Fitz, M., Bading, E., Michelfelder, A., (2006). Can Justice Be Taught? Valuing Justice and Professionalism in the Medical School Curriculum, in Kayhan Parsi, Myles Sheehan (eds.), Healing as Vocation: A Medical Professionalism Primer, Washington, DC: Rowman & Littlefield, pp. 77–91.
 Kuczewski, M.G. (2006) The Problem with Evaluating Professionalism: The Case Against the Current Dogma, in Delese Wear, Julie Aultman (eds.), Professionalism in Medicine: Critical Perspectives, New York: Springer Publishing Company, pp. 185–198.
 Wear, D., Kuczewski, M.G. (2004) The Professionalism Movement: Can We Pause? American Journal of Bioethics, 4(2): 1-10.
 Kuczewski, M.G. (1997) Fragmentation and Consensus: Communitarian and Casuist Bioethics, Washington D.C. Georgetown University Press.

External links 
 Bioethics
 Mark G. Kuczewski, Ph.D., profile, Loyola University Chicago faculty
 Neiswanger Institute for Bioethics & Health Policy, Loyola University Chicago Stritch School of Medicine
 Introduction to Clinical Bioethics, Mark G. Kuczewski, Ph.D.
 American Society for Bioethics and Humanities

American philosophers
Year of birth missing (living people)
Living people
Loyola University Chicago faculty
Presidents of the American Society for Bioethics and Humanities